Shannon O'Donnell may refer to:

 Shannon O'Donnell (meteorologist) (born 1973), American meteorologist and news anchor
 Shannon O'Donnell (writer), American travel writer